Ferretti was an Italian professional cycling team that existed from 1969 to 1972. It was sponsored by the Ferretti kitchen company, based in Capannoli. Gösta Pettersson won the general classification of the 1971 Giro d'Italia with the team.

References

Further reading

External links

Cycling teams based in Italy
Defunct cycling teams based in Italy
1969 establishments in Italy
1972 disestablishments in Italy
Cycling teams established in 1969
Cycling teams disestablished in 1972